Marie Renée Schwarzenbach since 1904 Schwarzenbach-Wille (née Wille; September 4, 1883 - April 26, 1959) was a Swiss socialite and daughter of the Swiss General Ulrich Wille. She was a granddaughter of German diplomat Count Friedrich Wilhelm von Bismarck (1783-1860) on her mother's side, and of novelist Eliza Wille (1809-1893) on her father's side.

Schwarzenbach was an equestrian sportswoman competing in main show jumping events in Switzerland and Germany, including the 1936 Summer Olympics in Berlin. She is also known for her detailed photographic family diary, and as the mother of novelist, travel literature writer and photographer Annemarie Schwarzenbach.

Biography 
Renée Schwarzenbach was the daughter of Swiss General Ulrich Wille and Countess Clara von Bismarck. Her father was head of the Swiss army during World War I. In 1904 she married Alfred Schwarzenbach, a wealthy businessman in the silk industry. They had five children.

She was a passionate horsewoman, photographer (which she first became interested in at the age of 14) and music-lover — in particular of Wagner. 
After her marriage she chronicled the family life on their Bocken Estate in Horgen near Lake Zürich in a detailed photographic diary. At her death she had filled 64 photo-albums, containing approx. 10,000 photos in total. Although she devoted herself to her husband and family she also had a long-term affair with the German opera singer Emmy Krüger.
  
Renée held political sympathies towards Germany, whether the Kaiser, Hitler or Adenauer was in power. During her many stays in Munich with her mistress, she saw the rise of Nazism as a way of overcoming the humiliating Treaty of Versailles. German diplomats in Switzerland praised her loyalty to the Nazi cause in their reports. After World War II, she helped out those Germans who had fled to Switzerland to escape the Allies.

She is known for her dominating personality and had a difficult relationship with her second daughter Annemarie, writer, photographer and traveller. This was partly due to the political differences between the two women: Renée being pro-German throughout the Nazi period and Annemarie holding decidedly anti-fascist views.

Bibliography 

Bilder mit Legenden. Ed. Alexis Schwarzenbach (Scheidegger & Spiess Zürich, 2001)

References

1883 births
1959 deaths
Swiss female equestrians
Olympic equestrians of Switzerland
Swiss women photographers
People from Thun
20th-century Swiss photographers
20th-century women photographers
Swiss LGBT sportspeople
Renée
Renée
Sportspeople from the canton of Bern